The Royal Philatelic Society London Meeting Notes Collection is a collection of notes and papers from meetings of the Royal Philatelic Society London from 1950 onwards. The collection forms part of the British Library Philatelic Collections.

References

British Library Philatelic Collections
Royal Philatelic Society London